The lost village of Muscott is located within the parish of Norton in the English county of Northamptonshire.

Gallery

References

Deserted medieval villages in Northamptonshire